Guy of Spoleto  may refer to:

 Guy I of Spoleto (d. 860)
 Guy II of Spoleto (d. 882/83)
 Guy III of Spoleto (d. 894), also King of Italy and Holy Roman Emperor
 Guy IV of Spoleto (d. 897)